Tedeschi may refer to:

Tedeschi (surname), including a list of people with the name
Fondaco dei Tedeschi, historic building in Venice
San Giorgio ai Tedeschi, church in Pisa
Tedeschi E.T.186, Italian glider plane
Tedeschi Food Shops, American chain of convenience stores

See also 
Tedesco (disambiguation)